Moneague College is a multidisciplinary institution located in Moneague,  Saint Ann, Jamaica on the main road between Kingston and Ocho Rios. The college is partly situated in the former colonial-era Moneague Hotel.

History
The Moneague Hotel was built in 1891. During World War II it was used as a soldiers' camp. In 1956, Dr Aubrey Phillips founded Moneague College on the site of the former hotel. The college has expanded today. The original hotel building that was once used for student accommodation and administrative offices was gutted by fire and is awaiting reconstruction.

Moneague College has expanded beyond a teacher training institution to a multi-disciplinary college, offering certificates, associate degrees and degrees in many areas, such as Tourism and Hospitality Management, Business Studies, Management Information Systems, Environmental Studies, Psychology and more. The college also has Pre- University Arts and Science and Continuing Education programmes.

External links 
 Aerial view
 Home page

Colleges in Jamaica
Educational institutions established in 1956
Buildings and structures in Saint Ann Parish
1956 establishments in the British Empire